Madison Thomas is an independent film and television writer and director from Winnipeg, Manitoba, Canada. She is most noted for her 2022 documentary film Buffy Sainte-Marie: Carry It On.

Career 
Thomas' debut feature film was the post-apocalyptic drama, This Is Why We Fight. She developed her second feature film, Ruthless Souls with assistance from Telefilm's Talent to Watch program. The film follows Jackie, an Ojibway artist from the North End, as she grieves the loss of her partner who died during gender reassignment surgery. Ruthless Souls played at the 2022 Reel Pride Film Festival in Winnipeg.

She has also directed episodes of the television series Taken, Burden of Truth, SkyMed and Pretty Hard Cases. She was a Canadian Screen Award nominee for Best Editorial Research at the 6th Canadian Screen Awards in 2018, for the Taken episode "Tina Fontaine".

In 2022, Thomas' documentary of Buffy Sainte-Marie, Buffy Sainte-Marie: Carry It On, premiered at the Toronto International Film Festival (TIFF). The film received an honorable mention for the Amplify Voices award at TIFF. For her work on the film, Thomas received the Directors Guild of Canada's Allan King Award for Excellence in Documentary.

Personal life 
Thomas grew up in Winnipeg's North End. She is of Ojibwe/Saulteaux and Russian/Ukrainian heritage. She studied filmmaking at the University of Winnipeg.

Filmography

Film

Television

References

External links

Living people
Métis filmmakers
Film directors from Winnipeg
Canadian women film directors
Canadian documentary film directors
Canadian television directors
Canadian women television directors
Canadian women documentary filmmakers
Year of birth missing (living people)
University of Winnipeg alumni
Canadian women screenwriters
Canadian women television writers